was legislated in the Diet of Japan by Prime Minister Fumimaro Konoe on 24 March 1938 to put the national economy of the Empire of Japan on war-time footing after the start of the Second Sino-Japanese War.

The State General Mobilization Law had fifty clauses, which provided for government controls over civilian organizations (including labor unions), nationalization of strategic industries, price controls and rationing, and nationalized the news media. The laws gave the government the authority to use unlimited budgets to subsidize war production, and to compensate manufacturers for losses caused by war-time mobilization. Eighteen of the fifty articles outlined penalties for violators.

The law was attacked as unconstitutional when introduced to the Diet in January 1938, but was passed due to strong pressure from the military and took effect from May 1938. It was abolished on 20 December 1945 by the American occupation authorities after the surrender of Japan.

The  was a supplemental law promulgated by Prime Minister Konoe as part of the State General Mobilization Law. It empowered the government to draft civilian workers to ensure an adequate supply of labor in strategic war industries, with exceptions allowed only in the case of the physically or mentally disabled.

The program was organized under the Ministry of Welfare, and at its peak 1,600,000 men and women were drafted, and 4,500,000 workers were reclassified as draftees (and thus were unable to quit their jobs).

See also 
 National Spiritual Mobilization Movement

Notes

References

1938 in Japan
Japan in World War II
Politics of the Empire of Japan
Price controls
1938 in law
Regulation in Japan